Dauphin Pond is a freshwater frozen pond in the Labyrinth of Wright Valley, McMurdo Dry Valleys. It was named by the Advisory Committee on Antarctic Names (2004) after a United States Coast Guard Dauphin helicopter (HH-65A) that landed on the pond January 20, 2004, in the course of sampling the pond.

See also 
Sarcophagus Pond

References 

Lakes of Victoria Land
McMurdo Dry Valleys